Edun is a surname. Notable people include:

Adegboyega Edun, Nigerian leader of the Egba people
Adetomiwa Edun, British actor of Nigerian and Ghanaian origin
Alice Edun, singer of Nigerian-Russian descent
Denrele Edun (born 1983), Nigerian television host
Tayo Edun (born 1998), English footballer
Wilfred Edun (1930-1990), cricketer from British Guiana